The 12463 / 12464 Rajasthan Sampark Kranti Express is a Superfast Express train of the Sampark Kranti Express series belonging to Indian Railways – North Western Railway zone that runs between  and  in India.
It operates as train number 12464 from Jodhpur to Sarai Rohilla and as train number 12463 in the reverse direction, serving the states of Delhi & Rajasthan.
This train was introduced in the interim budget of 2004 / 05 by the then Railway Minister of India Mr. Nitish Kumar.

Coaches
The 12464 / 12463 Rajasthan Sampark Kranti Express has 1 AC First Class cum AC 2 tier, 1 AC 2 tier, 1 AC 2 AC 3 tier, 3 Sleeper class, 3 General Unreserved & 2 EOG (Seating cum Luggage Rake) coaches. It does not carry a pantry car.

Service

Routeing

Traction
Both trains are hauled by a Tughlakabad Diesel Loco Shed-based WDM-3A or WDP-4D locomotive on its entire journey.

References

External links
 

Transport in Delhi
Transport in Jodhpur
Sampark Kranti Express trains
Rail transport in Rajasthan
Rail transport in Haryana
Rail transport in Delhi
Railway services introduced in 2011